The following Confederate States Army units and commanders fought in the Meridian campaign (3 February – 6 March 1864) during the American Civil War. Order of battle was compiled from the army organization during the campaign. The strength numbers listed in the tables are "present for duty".

Abbreviations used

Military rank
 LTG = Lieutenant General
 MG = Major General
 BG = Brigadier General
 Col = Colonel
 Ltc = Lieutenant Colonel
 Maj = Major
 Cpt = Captain
 Lt  = Lieutenant

Other
 w = wounded
 mw = mortally wounded
 k = killed

Meridian Expedition: Confederate forces
LTG Leonidas Polk
 Escort: Louisiana Company: Lt P. M. Kenner
 General staff and escort: 5 officers, 44 men

Infantry corps

Cavalry corps
MG Stephen D. Lee
 Escort: Georgia Company: Cpt T. M. Nelson
 Strength: 652 officers, 7,685 men, no. guns not reported

Notes
Footnotes

Citations

References

 
 
 

American Civil War orders of battle